Government Camp is an unincorporated community and census-designated place located in Clackamas County, Oregon, United States, on the base of Mount Hood and north of Tom Dick and Harry Mountain. It is the only town within  of Mount Hood and therefore is the de facto "mountain town" or "ski town". It is the gateway to several ski resorts, with the most popular being Timberline Lodge and Mount Hood Skibowl. Government Camp also has its own, smaller ski resort, Summit Pass.

The community is located within the Mount Hood Corridor on U.S. Route 26 (the Mount Hood Highway), near its intersection with Oregon Route 35 and the Barlow Pass summit of the Cascade Range. As of the 2010 census, the community had a population of 193. The government's 2016 estimate indicated a population of 121 persons.

Demographics

History
Government Camp was given its name by settlers traveling the Barlow Road, who discovered several wagons abandoned there by the Regiment of Mounted Riflemen.  A sign in front of the town's post office states, "Formerly a camp on the old Barlow Road, the village was named in 1849 when U.S Cavalry troops were forced to abandon wagons and supplies here."

Government
Over the last decade, Government Camp went through a revitalization effort due to a Clackamas County urban renewal district. With that district expiring in 2007, the community had been looking at ways to maintain current services. At a town hall meeting on November 17, 2006, citizens voted 41–58 not to form a village. Many residents voted against the proposal in order to seek incorporation. In May 2010, residents of the community voted on incorporation, but the measure failed by a vote of 48 against incorporation and 35 in favor of incorporation. Had the city been formed, the city would have had 138 registered voters within the city limits at the time of formation.

Climate
Government Camp's climate is borderline between the dry summer version of a humid continental climate and the extremely rare dry summer versions of a subarctic climate and subpolar oceanic climate (Köppen classification Dsb, Dsc, or Csc), with cool, dry summers and cold, very wet winters with huge snowfall due to the powerful Aleutian Low.

See also

 Mount Hood Village, Oregon, a census-designated place
 Village (Oregon)
 Zigzag Mountain

References

External links 

 Government Camp Village from the Clackamas County Dep't of Transportation and Development
 Mt Hood Cultural Center & Museum
 Webcam of U.S. 26 road conditions near Government Camp, from Oregon Department of Transportation

Oregon Trail
Portland metropolitan area
Mount Hood
Unincorporated communities in Clackamas County, Oregon
Census-designated places in Oregon
Unincorporated communities in Oregon